Florencio Varela is a partido in the south of Gran Buenos Aires urban area in Buenos Aires Province, Argentina.

Its capital is Florencio Varela.

Name
The partido is named in honour of Argentine writer and journalist Florencio Varela.

Districts

List of Districts in the partido, and their population
Bosques (51,663)
Estanislao Severo Zeballos (20,967)
Florencio Varela (120,678)
Gobernador Julio A. Costa (49,291)
Ingeniero Juan Allan (26,602)
Villa Brown (6,034)
Villa San Luis (10,234)
Villa Santa Rosa (22,017)
Villa Vatteone (35,985)
La Capilla (5,499)

References

External links

 History of the partido 
 Florencio Varela news

 
1891 establishments in Argentina
Partidos of Buenos Aires Province